Notozomus is a genus of hubbardiid short-tailed whipscorpions, first described by Mark Harvey in 1992.

Species 
, the World Schizomida Catalog accepts the following seventeen species:

 Notozomus aterpes Harvey, 1992 – Australia (Queensland)
 Notozomus boonah Harvey, 2000 – Australia (Queensland)
 Notozomus bronwenae Harvey, 2000 – Australia (Queensland)
 Notozomus curiosus Harvey, 2000 – Australia (Queensland)
 Notozomus daviesae Harvey, 1992 – Australia (Queensland)
 Notozomus elongatus Harvey, 2000 – Australia (Queensland)
 Notozomus faustus Harvey, 2000 – Australia (Queensland)
 Notozomus ingham Harvey, 1992 – Australia (Queensland)
 Notozomus jacquelinae Harvey, 2000 – Australia (Queensland)
 Notozomus ker Harvey, 1992 – Australia (Queensland)
 Notozomus majesticus Harvey, 2000 – Australia (Queensland)
 Notozomus maurophila Harvey, 2000 – Australia (Queensland)
 Notozomus monteithi Harvey, 1992 – Australia (Queensland)
 Notozomus raveni Harvey, 1992 – Australia (Queensland)
 Notozomus rentzi Harvey, 1992 – Australia (Queensland)
 Notozomus spec (Harvey, 1992) – Australia (Queensland)
 Notozomus wudjl Harvey, 2000 – Australia (Queensland)

References 

Schizomida genera